The Sisters of Holy Cross Menzingen is a Catholic congregation of nuns. It was founded in 1844 in Menzingen, Canton Zug, Switzerland by Mother Bernarda Heimgartner, now listed as "Venerable" by the Catholic Church. The order is now international with about 1700 sisters.

History

Theodosius Florentini

Rev. Fr. Theodosius Florentini OFM Cap. envisaged a religious congregation of teachers who would educate children, especially girls, who as future mothers would preserve the faith in their families. Thus, he founded the Congregation of the Sisters of the Holy Cross in October 1844 with three young ladies, Maria Anna Heimgartner, (later Mother Bernarda), Cornelia Mader, and Feliciana Cramer. Before long, more young women joined them, and the sisters took up education in many church-run as well as Govt. Schools in Switzerland. Mother Bernarda is honored as the Co-foundress of the Congregation.

Mother Bernarda Heimgartner
Maria Anna Heimgartner was born in Fislisbach, Canton Aargau on November 26, 1822. Her father died when she was fourteen. After her education, she worked as a children's nurse between 1838 and 1840. Feeling called to religious life, she began studies with the canonesses in Baden. She joined the 'Sisters of Divine Providence' in Ribeauville, Alsace between 1843 and 1844.

From the village of Menzingen the congregation grew and spread mainly to the poorer central parts of Switzerland. 

In July 1883 the first five Holy Cross Sisters arrived in Durban in answer to a call for missionaries in Southern Africa. They travelled by steamship from Southampton. Upon arriving they up the St John's River and continued their journey by ox wagon to Umtata, where they established their first school and a hospital.

Nine sisters travelled from Menzingen to nurse the sick in government hospitals at Trivandrum and Quilon, India.

Location 
 Switzerland (1844)
 England (1902)
Sri Lanka (1930)
Belfast, Northern Ireland

Institutions

Schools
Holy Cross School, London, UK
Holy Cross Preparatory School, London, UK

Hospitals
St. Josephs Home for the Elders, Jaffna, Sri Lanka
Holy Cross Hospital, Jaffna, Sri Lanka

References

External links

Catholic religious institutes established in the 19th century
Catholic female orders and societies
1844 establishments in Switzerland